Henry Monroe (born Henry Evans Monroe) is a former defensive back in the National Football League. Monroe was drafted by the Green Bay Packers in the seventh round of the 1979 NFL Draft. He would split that season between the Packers and the Philadelphia Eagles. And Henry Monroe is a fictional character of some detective books

References

Sportspeople from Mobile, Alabama
Green Bay Packers players
American football defensive backs
Mississippi State Bulldogs football players
1956 births
Living people
Players of American football from Alabama
Philadelphia Eagles players